During 1996 to 1998, a 50-episodes serial titled Dayasagar, based on the 1978 film of the same name about Jesus Christ, aired on DD National. The series was also dubbed into Telugu, Tamil, Hindi, Malayalam and other languages for repeat telecasts.

Vijayachander portrayed the role of Jesus in it. He was born Vijayachander Telidevara. He is an Indian film theater actor, method actor, director and producer, predominantly appearing in Telugu cinema and South Indian films. He made his acting debut in the film Sudigundalu, which won the National Film Award for Best Feature Film in Telugu in 1967.

He is known for portraying the roles of devotional characters like Jesus and Sai Baba of Shirdi. He has acted in Telugu, Tamil and Malayalam language films. In 2007, he has donated land for old film artists and Movie Artists Association.

References

1996 Indian television series debuts
1998 Indian television series endings
DD National original programming
Indian television series
Television series based on the Bible
Television series about Christianity
Television shows set in Palestine
Television shows set in ancient Egypt
Television series set in the Roman Empire
Portrayals of Jesus on television
Nativity of Jesus on television
Cultural depictions of the Devil
Cultural depictions of Herod the Great
Cultural depictions of Judas Iscariot
Cultural depictions of John the Baptist
Cultural depictions of the Biblical Magi
Cultural depictions of Mary, mother of Jesus
Cultural depictions of Paul the Apostle
Cultural depictions of Saint Peter
Cultural depictions of Pontius Pilate
Cultural depictions of Mary Magdalene
Saint Joseph (husband of Mary)
Cultural depictions of the Passion of Jesus
Indian historical television series
Indian period television series